Wang Kuan-hung (born 23 January 2002) is a Taiwanese swimmer who competes in the butterfly and freestyle events.

In 2018, he represented Taiwan at the Asian Games held in Jakarta, Indonesia. He competed in the men's 100 metre butterfly and men's 200 metre butterfly events. He placed 7th at the men's 200 metre butterfly. In October, he represented Chinese Taipei at the 2018 Summer Youth Olympics in Buenos Aires, Argentina. He competed in Boys' 100 metre butterfly, Boys' 200 metre butterfly and Boys' 200 metre freestyle. He placed 11th in Boys' 100m Butterfly and 4th in Boys' 200m Butterfly. In November, he competed in one of the 2018 FINA Swimming World Cup stop in Singapore, finished in 2nd place and set the new Taiwan's national record in Men's 200m Butterfly with a time of 1:52.38.

In 2019, he represented Taiwan at the World Aquatics Championships held in Gwangju, South Korea. In the men's 200 metre butterfly he did not qualify to compete in the semi-finals. He also competed in the men's 4 × 200 metre freestyle relay event. In August, he competed in FINA World Junior Swimming Championships and achieved Olympic 'A' cut for 200m butterfly, with a time of 1:56.48, becomes second Taiwanese swimmer qualifies for the 2020 Summer Olympics in Tokyo. Furthermore, he broke Taiwan's national record of Men's 100m butterfly with a time of 52.83. In October, he represented Taipei City at The National Games of Taiwan in Taoyuan, Taiwan. He broke the previous national record he had set in Men's 100m and 200m butterfly, clocked in with a time of 52.68 and 1:55.72 respectively.
In December, he competed in 2019 Toyota U.S. Open and got a silver medal with 1:55.82.

In 2020, he represents Cali Condors in International Swimming League. He competed in Men's 200m Butterfly and placed 3rd with a time of 1:50.79, which breaks the previous World Junior Record of short course Men's 200m Butterfly set by Japan's Daiya Seto in 2012. It is also the new Taiwan national record.

References

External links
 

Living people
2002 births
Place of birth missing (living people)
Taiwanese male swimmers
Male butterfly swimmers
Taiwanese male freestyle swimmers
Swimmers at the 2018 Asian Games
Asian Games competitors for Chinese Taipei
Swimmers at the 2018 Summer Youth Olympics
Swimmers at the 2020 Summer Olympics
Olympic swimmers of Taiwan